Marc Egnal (born December 11, 1943) is an American historian, academic and a professor of history at York University, Toronto, Canada. He completed his B.A. at Swarthmore College in 1965, M.A. in 1967 and Ph.D. in 1974 from the University of Wisconsin–Madison.

He has written on the American Revolution and American Civil War. He is the author of four books on American history including A Mighty Empire: The Origins of the American Revolution (1988); Divergent Paths: How Culture and Institutions Have Shaped North American Growth (1996); and  New World Economies:the Growth of the Thirteen Colonies and Early Canada (1998).

His book, Clash of Extremes: The Economic Origins of the Civil War (2009), argues that "more than any other reason, the evolution of the Northern and Southern economies explains the Civil War."

Most recently, Egnal has turned his attention to US novels and the value of Big Data in understanding this literature.  See his essay, "Crunching Literary Numbers," in the Gray Matter column of the New York Times, July 12, 2013.

References

External links
 Faculty Profile at York University

1943 births
Living people
Canadian people of American descent
21st-century American historians
American male non-fiction writers
Historians of the United States
Historians of Canada
Canadian non-fiction writers
Academic staff of York University
University of Wisconsin–Madison alumni
Swarthmore College alumni
21st-century American male writers